Al-Nibras Ideal School is a school founded in September 2004 to cater to the needs of 4- to 21-year-old children with mild to moderate intellectual disability.

The school offers all its services in the Arabic language using the Kuwaiti dialect. The school offers speech therapy, physical therapy, occupational therapy, social worker, counselor, nurse and monthly medical checkup

See also

 Education in Kuwait
 List of schools in Kuwait

External links
 , the school's official website

2004 establishments in Kuwait
Al Farwaniyah Governorate
Educational institutions established in 2004
Special education
Private schools in Kuwait
Special schools